Downpatrick Loop Platform railway station (often shorted to The Loop Platform or simply The Loop) is a junction station owned and operated by the Downpatrick and County Down Railway, heritage railway in Northern Ireland.

The station is on the only operational railway triangle on a preserved railway. It can only be accessed by train - similar to Manulla Junction in County Mayo or Smallbrook Junction on the Isle of Wight.

History

Belfast & Co. Down Railway 
The original Downpatrick railway station was constructed as part of the Belfast and County Down Railway (BCDR) mainline from Queens Quay, Belfast to Downpatrick. However, with growing railway expansion in the Victorian era and the connecting Downpatrick, Dundrum and Newcastle Railway being subsequently built with a junction north of Downpatrick for through trains between Queens Quay, Belfast and Newcastle railway station (County Down). The awkward permanent way with Downpatrick railway station being on a branch necessitated the construction of the triangle and Loop platform.  Therefore, trains could call at Downpatrick or use the avoiding line with connections for passengers and goods at the Loop Platform, thereby making the railway operationally from a signalling point of view, more efficient using a railway triangle.

Downpatrick Loop Platform was opened on 24 July 1892 and closed on 16 January 1950.

Downpatrick & Co. Down Railway 
Because the Loop Platform had no road access, it was spared demolition unlike most of the BCDR mainline from Belfast Queen's Quay to Newcastle. It remained derelict from its closure in 1950 until the Autumn of 1987, when the Downpatrick & Ardglass Railway (since renamed the Downpatrick & Co. Down Railway) reached the Loop Platform with rebuilt track from Downpatrick town. The first train to call at the Loop Platform since its closure was a works train hauled by a former CIÉ E Class diesel on 10 October 1987. Passenger services began on 5 December 1987. In January 1993, the canopy was restored with funding from the International Fund for Ireland.

In Spring 2014, the Loop Line (The former mainline which avoided Downpatrick) was re-laid and the platform refurbished. During 2015, relaying commenced on the South Line (The direct line to Downpatrick). Due to its isolated nature and simplistic features, it is a popular filming location and was used as Polegate Junction in Agatha and the Truth of Murder, as well as Derry Girls Season 3 episode Strangers on a Train.

Services

Gallery

References

Railway stations in County Down
Railway stations opened in 1882
Rail junctions in Northern Ireland
1882 establishments in Ireland
Railway stations in Northern Ireland opened in the 19th century